Peter Nielsen (born 3 June 1968) is a Danish former professional footballer, who works as assistant manager for Danish 1st Division club Fremad Amager. He won ten international caps and scored one goal for the Denmark national team, with whom he won Euro 1992, though he did not play at the tournament.

Career
Nielsen started his career in the Danish 3rd Division with BK Fremad Amager, and also played with Lyngby Boldklub. He moved abroad to play for Borussia Mönchengladbach in the Bundesliga, before ending his career with F.C. Copenhagen back in Denmark. He retired in 2003.

He began a coaching career in 2005. First as an assistant manager in B93, then training the youth team at Kjøbenhavns Boldklub.

From 1 January 2006 to 26 May 2008 he was Ståle Solbakken's assistant manager in F.C. Copenhagen. He stopped after a period way from the team as he was absent owing to illness.

Honours
 UEFA Euro: 1992
 DFB-Pokal: 1994–95

References

External links
 

1968 births
Living people
Expatriate footballers in Germany
Danish men's footballers
Association football midfielders
Denmark international footballers
Denmark under-21 international footballers
Danish football managers
Lyngby Boldklub players
Borussia Mönchengladbach players
F.C. Copenhagen players
Danish Superliga players
Bundesliga players
2. Bundesliga players
UEFA Euro 1992 players
UEFA European Championship-winning players
F.C. Copenhagen non-playing staff
Footballers from Copenhagen